The Challenge international du Nord (Northern International Challenge) was an annual football tournament featuring clubs from Northern France and Belgium as they could not play in the French Championship. Later teams from Switzerland, Netherlands and England were invited to play. It was hosted in the Lille area (Roubaix, Tourcoing and Lille) between 1898 and 1914 in different formats.

The Tournament 
The tournament format changed over the years, originally being played between a French group of teams and a Belgium group, with the semi-finals being played between a French and a Belgian team.

From 1905, the tournament was opened to clubs from the Netherlands, Prinses Wilhelmina en 1905 and GVC Wageningen. Also from Switzerland, BSC Old Boys and Grasshoppers.
Between 1909 and 1914, the tournament was exclusively played between French clubs and amateur clubs from England .

Awards 
With the exception of Le Havre AC in 1900, the clubs from Belgium won trophies between 1898 and 1908 . Royale Union Saint-Gilloise being the most successful reaching four finals in five years and winning three of them (1904, 1905, 1907).

Sources 
RSSSF et archives Pages de Foot
Olivier Chovaux, 50 ans de football dans le Pas-de-Calais, Arras, Artois Presses Université, 2001

External links 
 RSSSF Challenge international du Nord

Association football friendly trophies
1898 in association football